Highbury & Islington is a London Underground and National Rail interchange station in the London Borough of Islington, north London. It is served by the London Underground's Victoria line and the Great Northern's Northern City Line, as well as the London Overground's East and North London Lines.

It is the terminus of the East London Line, with Canonbury the preceding station.

It is the 6th busiest station in the UK with over 30 million people a year using it in 2018/19 according to Office of Rail and Road statistics.

The station is in Travelcard Zone 2.

History

The current station derives from two earlier stations. The first, which was on the same site, was a Victorian-gothic building, designed by Edwin Henry Horne, with a drive-in forecourt, opened on 26 September 1850 by the North London Railway (NLR) and called 'Islington'. Following reconstruction, it was renamed 'Highbury & Islington' on 1 July 1872.

Opened as 'Highbury', it was renamed to 'Highbury & Islington' on 20 July 1922. This line and stations were operated by the Metropolitan Railway and its successors from 1913 until 1975 when the line, by then called the Northern City Line, was transferred to British Rail. The route is now operated by Great Northern.

The NLR station was damaged by a V-1 flying bomb on 27 June 1944; however, its main building remained in use until it was demolished in the 1960s during the building of the Victoria line. The original westbound platform buildings remain, as does a small part of the original entrance to the left of the present station entrance.

The present single-storey structure was built in the 1960s for the opening of the Victoria line on 1 September 1968 and is the entrance for all lines. When the escalators to the deep-level platforms were opened, the GN&CR station building was closed. Its disused entrance remains and was refurbished externally in 2006 – it houses signalling equipment for the Victoria line.

The Victoria line was built to give as many interchanges as possible with Underground and British Rail lines, with, wherever possible, cross-platform connection between different lines heading in the same direction. To this end, at Highbury & Islington the northbound Northern City Line platform was reallocated to the southbound Victoria line to give a direct link between the two southbound platforms; a new northbound platform was constructed for each line; the northbound running NCL tunnel was diverted to its new platform; and the southbound Victoria line tunnel was joined to the old northbound NCL tunnel.

Between 14 May 1979 and 11 May 1985 the station was served by the Crosstown Linkline diesel multiple unit service between to Camden Road and North Woolwich. 

The former train operating company Anglia Railways ran services known as London Crosslink from Norwich to Basingstoke via Stratford, which called at Highbury & Islington.  This service operated from 2000 until 2002.

During this closure, the Highbury & Islington station ticket hall was extended and step-free access installed on all of the London Overground platforms. The North London Line reopened on 1 June 2010; however, the East London Line platforms did not open until March 2011, whilst the Western Curve was reinstated, linking the station to Dalston Junction and the rest of the East London Line.

Platforms
Highbury & Islington has a total of eight platforms, divided between those that are on the surface and those that are deep level:
Platform 1 – London Overground (East London Line) services to 
Platform 3 – Northbound Victoria line
Platform 4 – Northbound Northern City Line
Platform 5 – Southbound Victoria line
Platform 6 – Southbound Northern City Line
Platform 7 – London Overground Westbound North London Line
Platform 8 – London Overground Eastbound North London Line

Surface platforms
Platforms for North London Line (NLL) and East London Line (ELL) services are operated by London Overground. On 1 June 2010, following the temporary closure of the route from February 2010 to May 2010, NLL services were rerouted to the newly built platforms 7 and 8 for the AC lines, which replaced the old "special use" platform. Platforms 1 and 2, which previously served the NLL route on third rail lines, were closed from February 2010 for reconstruction and reopened in 2011 for the ELL services. The change of platforms allows ELL services to operate without having to cross over NLL tracks.  An island platform provides platforms 2 and 7; platforms 1 and 8 are side platforms. When the ELL extension to Clapham Junction was first instituted in December 2012, trains ran through to Clapham Junction from this station throughout the week. Following a timetable change in December 2014, they only do so on Sundays, with  the second destination served alongside Crystal Palace on weekdays & Saturdays.

Deep-level platforms
Platforms 3 to 6 are deep-level platforms. Platforms 3 and 5 are used for services on the Victoria line; 4 and 6 are used for Northern City Line services.

Services

London Overground

All times below are correct .

East London Line

Mondays to Saturdays there is a service every 6–9 minutes throughout the day, while on Sundays before 13:00 there is a service every 15 minutes, changing after that to every 7–8 minutes until the end of service.

North London Line

Mondays to Fridays there is a service approximately every 7–8 minutes throughout the morning and evening peaks, changing to roughly every 10 minutes off-peak. On Saturdays the service is approximately every 10 minutes. Sunday services are similar in frequency to the services on Saturdays.

Great Northern

Mondays to Fridays there is a service approximately every 4–15 minutes until 10:00, when the frequency is every 10 minutes until 16:00, when the frequency again changes to between every 4–15 minutes until the end of service. Prior to December 2015, weekend and evening services were diverted to Kings Cross from Finsbury Park.

London Underground

Victoria line

Westbound there is a service every 2–5 minutes all day, all week. Eastbound there are services every 2–8 minutes all day, all week.

Connections
London Buses routes 4, 19, 21, 30, 43, 263 and 393 and night routes N19, N41, N271 and N277 serve the station.

References

Sources

External links

Original NLR station
London Transport Museum Photographic Archive
 

Geoffrey Tribe's Railway Photo Halt
GN&CR station building, June 1968
New station entrance, June 1968

Victoria line stations
London Underground Night Tube stations
Tube stations in the London Borough of Islington
Railway stations in the London Borough of Islington
Former North London Railway stations
Railway stations in Great Britain opened in 1850
Former Great Northern and City Railway stations
Railway stations in Great Britain opened in 1904
Railway stations in Great Britain closed in 1975
Railway stations in Great Britain opened in 1976
Railway stations served by Govia Thameslink Railway
Railway stations served by London Overground
DfT Category C2 stations 
DfT Category F1 stations 
Unopened Northern Heights extension stations
Highbury
Railway stations located underground in the United Kingdom